QWERTY Tummy is a term denoted for the phenomenon of an upset stomach that comes from the use of filthy keyboards and in more recent times, from the use of mobile phones' keypads.

Background

QWERTY Tummy was first coined by British consumers group in the context of its study on office hygiene. A survey and chemical analysis of 33 keyboards by scientific experts found among other substances, food poisoning bugs such as e-coli and staphylococcus, comparing the results to those found on lavatory seats and door handles. The findings, according to the experts were supposedly identical to offices all over Britain with some keyboards harboring 150 times the acceptable limit that a human can endure and five times more bacteria than lavatory seats.

The QWERTY addition to the term is a direct reference to the layout of a typical keyboard's alphabets which was coined in 1980, as result of the persistent use of the term despite changes in the layout.

Importance

Apart from the statistics pointing towards an accumulation of 150 times the acceptable level of bacteria for a human and five times the bacteria on an average toilet seat, two keyboards  had ‘warning levels’ of Staphylococcus aureus, and two others had ‘worryingly elevated’ levels of coliforms and enterobacteria, ‘putting users at high risk of becoming ill from contact’, resulting in Diarrhea, and other stomach-related  infections.

References

Computer keyboards